The 2014 Michigan House of Representatives elections were held on November 4, 2014, with partisan primaries to select the parties' nominees in the various districts on August 5, 2014. Members elected at the 2014 election served in the 98th Michigan Legislature which convened on January 7, 2015.

Term-limited members
Under the Michigan Constitution, members of the state Senate are only able to serve two four-years terms, and members of the House of Representatives are limited to three two-years terms. The following members are term-limited from seeking re-election to the House in 2014.

Democrats (12)
 5th District: Fred Durhal, Jr. (Detroit)
 6th District: Rashida Tlaib (Detroit)
 8th District: David Nathan (Detroit)
 12th District: Douglas Geiss (Taylor)
 13th District: Andrew Kandrevas (Southgate)
 21st District: Dian Slavens (Canton)
 22nd District: Harold Haugh (Roseville)
 27th District: Ellen Cogen Lipton (Huntington Woods)
 34th District: Woodrow Stanley (Flint)
 37th District: Vicki Barnett (Farmington Hills)
 62nd District: Kate Segal (Battle Creek)
 84th District: Terry Brown (Pigeon)

Republicans (14)
 19th District: John J. Walsh (Livonia)
 36th District: Pete Lund (Shelby Township)
 38th District: Hugh Crawford (Novi)
 42nd District: Bill Rogers (Brighton)
 43rd District: Gail Haines (Waterford)
 44th District: Eileen Kowall (White Lake)
 45th District: Tom McMillin (Rochester Hills)
 47th District: Cindy Denby (Handy Township)
 58th District: Kenneth Kurtz (Coldwater)
 59th District: Matt Lori (Constantine)
 63rd District: James "Jase" Bolger (Marshall)
 80th District: Robert Genetski (Saugatuck)
 82nd District: Kevin Daley (Lum)
 90th District: Joseph Haveman (Holland)
 98th District: Jim Stamas (Midland)
 104th District: Wayne Schmidt (Traverse City)

Results
The election resulted in Republicans gaining 4 seats with Democrats losing 4 seats.

On November 6, Kevin Cotter, Republican from the 99th District, was elected Speaker of the House, Tom Leonard, Republican from the 93rd District, was elected Speaker pro tempore, and Tim Greimel, Democrat from the 29th District, was re-elected Minority Leader.

Districts 1–28

Districts 29–55

Districts 56–83

Districts 84–110

Special Elections

75th District
Brandon Dillon resigned on August 3, 2015 after being elected chairman of the Michigan Democratic Party. Under state law, Governor Rick Snyder called a special primary election on November 4, 2015 and a special general election on March 8, 2016.

Democrat David LaGrand defeated Michael Scruggs with 81% of the vote in the Democratic primary. Blake Edmonds was unopposed in the Republican primary.

80th and 82nd Districts
Vacancies in the 80th and 82nd districts were caused by the expulsion of Cindy Gamrat and resignation of Todd Courser, respectively, on September 11, 2015. Under state law, Lieutenant Governor Brian Calley called a special primary election on November 4, 2015 and a special general election on March 8, 2016.

In the G.O.P. primary, Mary Whiteford defeated seven other candidates, including Gamrat, with just over 50% of the vote in the 80th District; and Gary Howell won an 11-way primary, including Courser, with 27% of the vote in the 82nd District. David Gernant was unopposed in the Democratic primary in the 80th, and Margaret Guerrero DeLuca earned 85% in a three-way Democratic primary in the 82nd.

28th District
After the death of longtime Macomb County Treasurer Ted Wahby in December 2015, one-term state Rep. Derek Miller was appointed treasurer  and resigned his House seat effective February 1, 2016. On February 17, 2016, Gov. Rick Snyder called a special election to fill the remainder of Miller's term that expires at the end of 2016, with both the special primary and general elections to take place alongside the regularly scheduled elections.

District 28Republican PrimaryAntoine M. DavisonDemocratic PrimaryPatrick Green
Paul M. Kardasz
Lori M. Stone
Mike Westphall

11th District
Democratic state Rep. Julie Plawecki of the 11th District died unexpectedly while hiking in Oregon on June 25, 2016. Gov. Rick Snyder called a special election on July 5, 2016, to fill the remainder of Plawecki's term, with the special primary taking August 30 and the special general election to take place alongside the regularly scheduled general election on November 8, 2016. The primary was canceled on July 13, 2016, by Snyder after only one Democrat and one Republican filed for the race, making a primary unnecessary. The Democratic candidate is Plawecki's 22-year-old daughter Lauren. The winner will serve the final two months of the term that expires December 31, 2016.Candidates'''
Robert Pope (R)
Lauren Plawecki (D)

See also
Michigan Senate election, 2014

References

House of Representatives
2014
Michigan House of Representatives
November 2014 events in the United States